Fabakary Tombong Jatta (born 16 November 1952) is a Gambian politician who has served as Speaker of the National Assembly since 2022 and the leader of the Alliance for Patriotic Reorientation and Construction (APRC) since 2017.

Early life and career 
Jatta was born on 16 November 1952 in Albreda, Gambia. He was educated at Armitage High School and Yundum College (1970–1973). He later worked as a teacher in Bansang from 1973 to 1977 and at Crab Island Junior Secondary School, Banjul from 1977 to 1979, before joining Nigeria Airways, where he became the district accountant.

Political career 
During the Gambian First Republic (1970–1974), he supported the National Convention Party and was taken to court for allegedly registering to vote in two different constituencies, which makes him look antipathy to the People's Progressive Party. He joined the APRC party on its establishment in 1996. Jatta was elected as the National Assembly Member (NAM) for Serekunda East in the 1997 parliamentary election and was re-elected in 2002, 2007 and 2012. In 2004, he was appointed as one of the Gambian members in the Pan-African Parliament. He was chosen as the National Assembly Majority Leader by President Yahya Jammeh following the 2007 election.

In 2010, Jatta was the principal nominator of Abdoulie Bojang for the position of Speaker. In February 2016, it was announced that Jatta was one of four Gambian parliamentarians also appointed to the Economic Community of West African States (ECOWAS) Parliament. Jatta retired as a NAM at the 2017 parliamentary election but became the new APRC party leader instead after the self-exile of former leader Yahya Jammeh. He raised some questions over the conduct of the 2017 election, pointing to irregularities in the conduct of the election and suggesting that some APRC supporters were harassed. He said that the APRC should not be blamed for the actions of Jammeh, saying "You cannot do collective punishment for people. We believe that the Gambia should move forward."

On 17 April 2022, he was appointed by President Adama Barrow as Speaker of the National Assembly following the 2022 elections.

References 

1952 births
Living people
Alliance for Patriotic Reorientation and Construction politicians
Leaders of political parties in the Gambia
Members of the Pan-African Parliament from the Gambia
Jola people
Speakers of the National Assembly of the Gambia
Gambian politicians